Pak Nam-chol (born January 12, 1979, in Pyongyang) is a North Korean judoka, who competed in the men's extra-lightweight category. He finished fifth in the 60-kg division at the 2003 World Judo Championships in Osaka, Japan, and later represented his nation North Korea at the 2004 Summer Olympics.

Pak qualified as a lone male judoka for the North Korean squad in the men's extra-lightweight class (60 kg) at the 2004 Summer Olympics in Athens, by placing fifth and receiving a berth from the World Championships in Osaka, Japan. Facing a rematch against Tunisia's Anis Lounifi after his bronze medal defeat at the World Championships, Pak could not mount enough strength to topple his opponent with a harai goshi (sweeping hip throw), and thereby lost his opening bout by an ippon at one minute and twenty-eight seconds.

References

External links

1979 births
Living people
North Korean male judoka
Olympic judoka of North Korea
Judoka at the 2004 Summer Olympics
Sportspeople from Pyongyang